Robert Jashari (2 February 1938 – 22 January 2022), also known as Bert Jashari, was an Albanian football player, who played for Partizani Tirana and the Albania national team. He won the National Championship six times between 1957 and 1964 with Partizani Tirana and he was the top goalscorer in the National Championship in three consecutive seasons between 1962 and 1965, with 18, 9 and 14 goals respectively. He scored a total of 69 league goals for Partizani.

Playing career

Club
Born in Tirana, Jashari was raised by his mother after his father died when he was only 3 years old. His mother remarried an Italian man, who later was allowed to leave communist Albania for Italy. Jashari replaced the country's most famous footballing son Loro Boriçi in the Partizani forward line in 1956 and played alongside other Albanian greats Refik Resmja and Panajot Pano in an all-conquering Partizani team. In 1968, he suddenly quit football after he surprisingly was not named in the squad facing Torino in the second leg of their 1968–69 European Cup Winners' Cup match away in Italy.

International
He made his debut for Albania in a June 1963 Olympic Games qualification match against Bulgaria in Tirana and earned a total of 7 caps, scoring 1 goal. His final international was a May 1965 FIFA World Cup qualification match away against Northern Ireland. In the latter game, Jashari scored Albania's first ever goal in a competitive international game.

Managerial career
Jashari took 31 Korriku to the Kategoria Superiore for the first time in history in 1981.

Personal life
Jashari died in Tirana on 22 January 2022, at the age of 83.

Honours
Albanian Superliga: 6
 1957, 1958, 1959, 1961, 1963, 1964

References

External links

1938 births
2022 deaths
Footballers from Tirana
Albanian footballers
Association football forwards
Albania international footballers
FK Partizani Tirana players
Kategoria Superiore players
Albanian football managers
KS Burreli managers
Kategoria Superiore managers